Ye Chaoqun (born 7 October 1984) is a Chinese para table tennis player. He won a gold and a silver at the 2008 Summer Paralympics.

Ye has congenital muscular dystrophy and hand/arm abnormalities.

References

1984 births
Living people
Table tennis players at the 2016 Summer Paralympics
Table tennis players at the 2012 Summer Paralympics
Table tennis players at the 2008 Summer Paralympics
Paralympic medalists in table tennis
Medalists at the 2008 Summer Paralympics
Chinese male table tennis players
Paralympic gold medalists for China
Paralympic silver medalists for China
Paralympic table tennis players of China
Table tennis players from Fujian
People from Xiamen
Fujian Normal University alumni
Table tennis players at the 2020 Summer Paralympics
FESPIC Games competitors